Flagg may refer to:

Places

United Kingdom
Flagg, Derbyshire, a village in the English Peak District.

United States
 Flagg, Illinois, an unincorporated community
 Flagg Township, Ogle County, Illinois
 Flagg, Oregon, an unincorporated community

Other uses
 Flagg (surname), a list of people and fictional characters
 USS Flagg, a fictional aircraft carrier in the G.I. Joe universe

See also
 American Flagg!, a comic, with Reuben Flagg as the eponymous hero
 Flag (disambiguation)